The NABI SFW was a line of standard (high)-floor transit buses available in 40' rigid (NABI 416) and 60' articulated (NABI 436) nominal lengths, manufactured by the Ikarus USA joint venture, then by American Ikarus and North American Bus Industries (NABI) between 1989 and 2013. In addition to the different lengths, the buses were sold with a variety of prime movers, including conventional diesel and CNG combustion engines and hybrid diesel-electric power.

NABI introduced the low-floor LFW line in 1997 to supplement the older SFW line; both of the NABI bus product lines featured similar styling, with the LFW having comparatively taller side windows over the low-floor portion of the bus. NABI was acquired by New Flyer in 2013, and NABI production was wound down by 2015; the last SFW order (for a set of NABI 416 buses) had been delivered in 2013.

Design
The NABI SFW line uses a model number incremented from the Hungarian model it was based on. As an alternative, a model numbering scheme similar to that used for the LFW line was applied. In this alternative scheme, the 416 and 436 were designated as 40-SFW and 60-SFW respectively, providing the nominal length along with the standard floor height (SFW) family. On the stamped vehicle identification plate, the model was identified as 416.nn or 436.nn, with nn sequentially assigned according to the order number. In total, there were 16 orders for the 416 (416.00 to 416.15, with one order cancelled) and 11 orders for the 436 (436.00 to 436.10, with two cancelled).

Like the preceding Crown-Ikarus 286 and Orion-Ikarus 286 articulated buses sold in the 1980s, rolling shells were assembled by the Ikarus Bus company in Hungary and finished in the United States to meet "Buy American" requirements for federally-subsidized transit vehicles. After its partnership with Crown Coach dissolved in 1986, Ikarus entered a joint venture with Union City Body Company (UCBC) of Union City, Indiana to sell domestic versions of the rigid Ikarus 415 as the Ikarus USA 416, with final assembly occurring at the UCBC plant in Anniston, Alabama, starting in 1989. The articulated Ikarus USA 436 was added to the lineup in 1991.

After UCBC declared bankruptcy in 1992, production was resumed at Anniston under the auspices of American Ikarus, which was renamed North American Bus Industries (NABI) in 1997. NABI was acquired by Cerberus Capital in 2006, then sold to New Flyer in 2013.

In 1998, NABI announced the SFW line would be available with a stainless steel frame as an option. A 'Gen II' restyle was unveiled in 2008, which added small quarter windows at the front between the windshield and the door or driver's side window, making the appearance similar to the contemporary NABI LFW Gen II (also unveiled in 2008) and the NABI BRT line (debuted in 2004). SFW bodies were assembled in Hungary until late 2012, when body production transitioned to Anniston.

Deployment 
The first 416 order was delivered to the Jacksonville Transportation Authority in 1989; the first 436 order was delivered to the Port Authority of Allegheny County in 1991. The final 436 order was delivered to SamTrans in 2002, and the final 416 order was delivered to New Jersey Transit in 2013. Other transit agencies with significant quantities of NABI SFW buses included the Metropolitan Transit Authority of Harris County (using 416; serving Houston), AC Transit (using 416; serving Alameda and Contra Costa Counties, California), SEPTA (using 416; serving Philadelphia) Maryland Transit Administration (using both the 416 and 436; serving Baltimore), and RTD Bus & Rail (using 436; serving Denver).

Ikarus USA built a prototype Model 416 bus powered by liquefied natural gas (LNG) in 1991, claimed to be the first in America. The prototype was built at the request of Harris County Metro and was completed three days before another bus was retrofitted with an LNG Detroit Diesel engine by Stewart & Stevenson.

See also
 Classic (transit bus)
 Flxible Metro
 Gillig Phantom
 Neoplan Transliner
 New Flyer High Floor
 Orion V
 Rapid Transit Series

References

External links

 
 

Buses of the United States
Vehicles introduced in 1989
Vehicles introduced in 1991
Articulated buses